Arash is an Iranian 20mm semi-automatic anti-materiel sniper rifle. This weapon is used by Iran and Hezbollah, and is named for the mythical Arash the Archer.

Features 

The Arash sniper rifle is a semi-automatic weapon with rotating bolt and gas operated reloading. It has an eight riflings straight back from left to right. It is 180 cm-long weapon, and is equipped with optical cameras. It is typically used as a shoulder-fired weapon. The rifle weighs between 18 and 20 kilograms, and fires 20 mm ammunition. It is fired in a standing position with a forward bipod and the gun resting over the user's shoulder, similar to an RPG. The stock is positioned midway along the length of the weapon with the pistol grip just forward of it. It is arranged in a bullpup configuration with the trigger assembly forward of the magazine, which is loaded behind the user's back, making reloading awkward. The recoil of firing a 20 mm round is mitigated by a huge cone-shaped quadruple baffle muzzle brake and the design of the gun which makes it pivot on the operator's shoulder. The scope appears to use a copy of the Barrett Optical Ranging System (BORS), which calculates atmospheric conditions to determine the rifle's optimal position to take an accurate shot. The position of the scope is relatively high, making it difficult to fire the rifle in the prone position, so the Iranians operate it using two-man motorcycle teams to perform "shoot and scoot" tactics. The Arash can be used to target hostile helicopters at a range of approximately 2,000 meters, and has the ability to be used against ground and armored targets as well as enemy trenches.

Users
Iran
Hezbollah
Liwa Assad Allah al-Ghalib fi al-Iraq wa al-Sham

See also 
 M82A2 (Shouldered 12.7mm bullpup meant to use against Helicopters)
 Anzio 20mm rifle
 Baher 23mm
 Denel NTW-20
 RT-20 (rifle)
 Vidhwansak
 List of anti-aircraft weapons
 Anti-aircraft warfare

References 

Semi-automatic rifles
20mm sniper rifles
20x102mm
Anti-materiel rifles
Bullpup rifles
Sniper rifles of Iran